The 17th Grand Prix des Frontières was a Formula Libre motor race held on 25 May 1947 at the Chimay Street Circuit in Chimay, Belgium. The Grand Prix was won by B. Bira in a Maserati 4CL. Bira also set fastest lap. Peter Monkhouse finished second in a Bugatti Type 51 and Louis Rosier was third in a Talbot-Lago.

Classification

References

Grand Prix des Frontières
Frontières
Frontières